John Harvard Mall is a brick plaza in Boston's Charlestown neighborhood, in the U.S. state of Massachusetts.

References

External links
 

Charlestown, Boston
Parks in Boston
Squares in Massachusetts